The Sha Tin Sprint Trophy was a Group 3 Thoroughbred handicap horse race in Hong Kong, run at Sha Tin over 1000 metres in October. 
It was replaced by the National Day Cup as of 2014, when the distance of that race was reduced from 1400 metres to 1000 metres.

Horses rated 95 and above are qualified to enter this race.

Winners

References 
Racing Post:
 

 Racing Information of Sha Tin Sprint Trophy (2011/12)
 The Hong Kong Jockey Club 

Horse races in Hong Kong